General elections were held in Niue on 7 May 2011, to elect the members of the Niue Assembly. In the leadup to the election Speaker of the Niue Assembly Atapana Siakimotu announced that he would be retiring from politics.

Electoral system
Of the 20 Niue Assembly members, six were elected on a common roll and fourteen in single-member constituencies. There were no political parties in Niue at the time of the election, and all candidates were independents.

The election was managed and controlled by the Chief Electoral Officer, Justin Kamupala, who was also the Secretary of the Niue Department of Justice, Lands and Survey.

Results
There were four changes in membership: Three new members were elected on the common roll, with caretaker PM Toke Talagi topping the vote. The only change in village seats was that Tofua Puletama was ousted from Makefu by Salilo Tongia in a close result.

Aftermath
As expected, Talagi was re-elected as PM with 12 of 20 votes.

See also
2012 Toi by-election

References

Niue
General election
Elections in Niue
May 2011 events in Oceania
Non-partisan elections